The Cooler Heads Coalition is a politically conservative "informal and ad-hoc group" in the United States, financed and operated by the Competitive Enterprise Institute. The group, which rejects the mainstream scientific opinion on climate change, made efforts to stop the government from addressing climate change.

Operation 
The Coalition operates a website, blog, and publishes the e-newsletter Cooler Heads Digest (last issued in 2012). It was founded by Consumer Alert.

The Cooler Heads Coalition describes itself as "focused on dispelling the myths of global warming by exposing flawed economic, scientific, and risk analysis".

Reception

The Washington Post described the group as "in the vanguard of efforts to cast doubt on the gravity of climate change and thwart government efforts to address it." The New Yorker has described the Cooler Heads Coalition as "an umbrella organization operated by the Competitive Enterprise Institute, a nonprofit that prides itself on its opposition to environmentalists."

According to The Washington Post, the group was for "long dismissed as cranks by mainstream scientists and politicians in both parties" until the group was embraced by Donald Trump's 2016 presidential campaign.
The Cooler Heads Coalition has been criticized for ties to energy industries that would be affected if the United States enacted any legislation targeted at reducing CO2 emissions.

Membership 
Notable members of the Coalition have included:
 60 Plus Association
 Alexis de Tocqueville Institution
 Americans for Prosperity
 Americans for Tax Reform
 American Legislative Exchange Council
 Committee for a Constructive Tomorrow
 Competitive Enterprise Institute
 Fraser Institute
 FreedomWorks
 George C. Marshall Institute
 The Heartland Institute
 Independent Institute
 Istituto Bruno Leoni
 JunkScience.com
 Lavoisier Group
 Liberty Institute
 National Center for Policy Analysis
 National Center for Public Policy Research

See also
 Climate change in the United States
 Climate change denial

References

External links 
 GlobalWarming.org

Climate change organizations based in the United States
Climate change denial
Organizations of environmentalism skeptics and critics
Organizations established in 1997
Organizations disestablished in 2006
Political organizations based in the United States
Conservative organizations in the United States